Alberto Capozzi (8 July 1886 – 27 June 1945) was an Italian film actor. He appeared in more than 130 films between 1908 and 1945.

Selected filmography
 The Two Sergeants (1913)
 The Open Door ( 1914 film) (La porta aperta) 
 The Sea of Naples (1919)
 The Mysterious Princess (1920)
 A Vanished World (1922)
 Marco Visconti (1941)
 The Jester's Supper (1942)
 The Woman of Sin (1942)

References

External links
 

1886 births
1945 deaths
Italian male film actors
Italian male silent film actors
Actors from Genoa
20th-century Italian male actors